"Way to Heaven" is the fourteenth single by Japanese recording artist Aya Ueto. It was released on March 14, 2007. "Way to Heaven" was included on the standard edition of Ueto's fifth studio album Happy Magic: Smile Project. The single was released in two formats: the limited edition, which includes an A4-sized 92-page photo book and a bonus DVD featuring music videos, TV spots, and footage of Ueto's past release events, and standard CD-only edition.

Chart performance 
"Way to Heaven" debuted on the Oricon Daily Singles chart at number 17 on March 13, 2007 and peaked at number 20 on the Oricon Weekly Singles chart, with 7,554 copies sold in its first week. The single charted for five weeks and has sold a total of 12,144 copies.

Track listing

Charts

Release history

References

External links 

2007 singles
Aya Ueto songs
2007 songs